Adani Ports and Special Economic Zone Limited (Adani Ports & SEZ; also APSEZ) is an Indian port operator and logistics company. APSEZ is India's largest private port operator with a network of 12 ports and terminals, including India's first port-based SEZ at Mundra.

Operations
, APSEZ operated 3 inland container depots (ICD) through its subsidiary Adani Logistics Ltd. In August 2022, they acquired an additional ICD from Navkar Corporation in Tumb, Gujarat.

It holds Category 1 License for the Indian Railways that helps in pan-India cargo movement. The trains owned by Adani Logistics were used to dispatch 30,000 tonnes of food grains to feed over 60 lakh citizens across the states of Tamil Nadu, Karnataka, West Bengal, and Maharashtra, during the 2020 COVID-19 lockdown.

APSEZ provides dredging and reclamation solutions, primarily for port and harbor construction. The Adani Group started investing in developing a dredging fleet in 2005. , APSEZ operated a fleet of 19 dredgers, the largest capital dredging fleet in India.

APSEZ has undertaken mangrove afforestation activities totalling 2885 Ha with a survival rate of over 85%. In 2016, the company announced that all ports and townships were being prepared to run on 100% renewable energy by 2018 using a mix of solar and wind energy.

In August 2017, a Morgan Stanley analysis described APSEZ as "stacking up well compared to its global peers: On operating metrics such as revenue growth, margins, EBIDTA growth, net income growth and return ratios (RoCE/ RoE), and based on bottom-up estimates by Morgan Stanley analysts covering global ports, APSEZ is expected to be in the top quartile across various operating metrics despite the tax holiday for Mundra port coming to an end".

In April 2022, it was announced that APSEZ (through its subsidiary, The Adani Harbour Services Ltd.) had acquired the third-party marine services provider, Ocean Sparkle Ltd.

In July 2022, APSEZ alongside the Gadot Group won the privatisation bid for Israel's Port of Haifa for  billion. Where Adani Ports and Gadot Group respectively hold 70%:30% of the shares.

In September 2022, Adani Ports secured a  billion deep-sea port construction project with the West Bengal government.

Ports and terminals
The company commenced operations at Mundra Port and currently operates 10 ports across 6 Indian states. Its ports have 45 berths and 14 terminals.

Mundra Port 

Mundra Port is a deep-water, all-weather, berthing on arrival port in the Gulf of Kutch. With 26 berths and dedicated terminals for different cargo and commodity types, it has an annual capacity to handle 231 MMT cargo. The port is connected to National Highway (NH) network through State Highways 48 via Anjar and SH-6. It has a privately developed rail network of 69  km connecting Adipur to Mundra port, which in-turn provides nationwide connectivity. It is capable of berthing fully loaded Capesize vessels, VLCC and ULCC. It handles dry bulk, break bulk, project cargo, liquid, containers, automobiles, and crude.

Since 2013, Mundra Port is India's largest private commercial port and hosts the world's largest coal import terminal. Mundra Port was known for introducing technological advancements that led to a high level of automation to enhance the efficiency of cargo handling.

, approximately 20,000 ships had docked at Mundra without a single accident representing the high safety standards implemented by the port authorities. Mundra Port had two single-point mooring (SPM) facilities to evacuate crude oil. Efforts to build a new container terminal in Mundra in partnership with French shipping giant CMA Terminals were underway .

Krishnapatnam Port 

Krishnapatnam Port Company Limited (KPCL) is a multi-cargo facility port located near Nellore, Andhra Pradesh. KPCL was acquired by Adani Ports in October 2020 for INR 13,000 cr. from the CVR Group. Originally, they had a 75% stake but by April 2021 they acquired the remaining 25% stake from Vishwasmudra Holdings.

Hazira Port 

The Hazira Port is a deep-water port located in the Gulf of Khambat, Surat, Gujarat. The port has been operational since 2005 and is a strategic port for Shell Energy India. Adani developed additional container jetties and multipurpose jetties. However in 2016, APSEZ faced setbacks to further development due to environmental complaints from the Hazira Fishermen Committee.

Dhamra Port 

Dhamra Port, Bhadrak, Odisha is a deep-water, all-weather, multi-user, a multi-cargo port located between Haldia and Paradeep ports on India's eastern coast. It was acquired by Adani in 2014 for Rs 5,500 crore which was the largest port sector deal at the time. It can handle dry bulk, breakbulk, project cargo, and containers. It has an annual capacity of 40 MMT cargo which can go up to 100 MMT in the future. It is located near the mineral belts of Odisha, Jharkhand, and West Bengal. It is connected by a 62 km railway line to Ranital Link Cabin which connects the main Howrah-Chennai line. It features a fully integrated conveyor system for import and export, a coastal circuit for fast cargo transit, and rapid loading silos with 4000 TPH capacity. Situated between Haldia in West Bengal and Paradip in Odisha, the Port is located 215 km from Bhubaneshwar. The port serves as a gateway to Nepal, Bangladesh, Myanmar and the entire geopolitical region, including the ASEAN region.

Dahej Port 

The Dahej Port is a deep-water, multi-cargo port in the Gulf of Khambat, Bharuch, Gujarat. It houses two dry and breaks bulk berths and dedicated facilities for handling project cargo. It has a capacity to handle 2 crore (20 million) tonnes per year. It handles all kinds of dry bulk and breakbulk cargo including coal, fertiliser, Agri products, steel cargo, and minerals. Additionally, it is capable of berthing capesize and Panama vessels. Dahej Port has a dedicated railway line that connects to the national railway network and it is also connected to National Highway 8. It is connected to the contiguous industrial hubs of Gujarat, Maharashtra and eastern Madhya Pradesh.
 
Dahej Port is equipped with India's first high speed elevated triangular gallery overload conveying system for coal transportation which reduces dust pollution. It accommodates a Ro-Ro Jetty for project cargo movement of 9.8 km long fully integrated high-speed conveyor.

Vizag Terminal 
APSEZ formerly owned a coal terminal in the Visakhapatnam Port. In 2022, only a few years into a 30-year contract they returned it to the Visakhapatnam Port Authority.

Mormugao Terminal 

Mormugao Terminal is a one-berth terminal located on the south-west coast of India. It has a capacity of 7 MMT cargo. It can handle coal cargo, Panamax and capsize vessels. Its main feature is a mechanized material handling system of conveyor systems and stacker cum reclaimers. It is connected to Maharashtra and Karnataka hinterlands via South Central Railways and Konkan Railways.

Vizhinjam Port 

APSEZ won a bid with the Kerala government to construct the Vizhinjam International Seaport in 2015. While the initial completion date was projected for 2020 the construction has experienced multiple delays due to the COVID-19 pandemic and cyclones. Adani sought an extension to 2024 but this led to disputes with the Kerala government.

Kattupalli Port 

Kattupalli Port lies 24 km north of Chennai Port and can handle 18 MMT cargo, including containers, breakbulk, and project cargo. It can berth fully loaded Capesize vessels and container vessels. It has a DPD warehouse within the container for movement of AEO and DPD consignments and a 45,000 sq. ft. warehouse with off-dock CFS. Kattupalli Port is connected to all CFSs/ICDs/SEZs in Chennai for imports and exports.

Ennore Terminal 
Ennore Terminal is a container terminal located in the northern suburbs of Chennai. It can handle 12 MMT cargo. It is connected to the hinterland by roads, including the upcoming EMRIP project and Northern Port Access Road.

Tuna Terminal 

Tuna Port is an all-weather, berthing on arrival port with the largest coal import terminal of 35,000 MT/Day discharge rate near Kandla Port. It has a capacity of 2 crore (20 million) tonnes per year and can handle 1,30,00 DWT vessels at berth. It can handle all kinds of dry bulk and breakbulk cargo including coal, fertilizer, agri-products, steel cargo, and minerals, and it is equipped with a fully integrated high-speed conveyor system. It is connected to National Highway (NH) 8A.

Dighi Port 

Dighi Port was acquired by APSEZ in February 2021, with the intention of being an alternative to the Jawaharlal Nehru Port, in Navi Mumbai.

Awards and recognition
In 2019, the organisation won an 'Honorary Special Mention' award at the first-ever National Corporate Responsibility (CSR) Award ceremony. The award was presented by Finance Minister Nirmala Sitharaman and her deputy, Anurag Thakur.

Controversies

Violation of environmental norms 
A committee chaired by Sunita Narain of the Centre for Science and Environment, was set up by the Union Ministry of Environment and Forests to inspect the ship-breaking facility of APSEZ near Mundra West Port in Gujarat's Kutch district. The committee, which submitted its report on 18 April 2013, found incontrovertible evidence of destruction, blocking of creeks, and non-compliance of other clearance conditions. Subsequently, on 29 July 2013, a public hearing for the project was held where people from four project-affected villages and nearby locations attended the public hearing at Tunda village in Mundra taluka and posed questions about the project and its impact on the environment. The public hearing was successfully completed with the answers to each question asked by villagers.  APSEZ was fines Rs 200 crore by the Ministry of Environment and Forests.

Myanmar activities 
On 30 March 2021, the group of activists Justice for Myanmar released a press statement regarding the international activities of Adani Ports & SEZ. They accused Adani of building a container port in Yangon, Myanmar on land leased from the Myanmar Economic Corporation (MEC), a military-run business conglomerate, which was directly contributing financially to the Myanmar Junta after the 2021 coup. The Australian Broadcasting Corporation corroborated the reporting of Justice for Myanmar including video evidence. MEC and its subsidiaries are sanctioned by US, UK and EU. On 7 March 2022, the Government Pension Fund of Norway placed the company under observation due to "unacceptable risk that the company contributes to or is responsible for serious violations of individuals’ rights in situations of war or conflict". In October 2021, APSEZ announced that they would be "exiting the company's investment in Myanmar" after a risk management committee's review.

CWC land grabbing 
The Supreme Court of India overturned an order given by the Gujarat High Court that allowed Adani Ports SEZ to reportedly take over 34 acres of land owned by Central Warehousing Corporation adjacent to the latter's Mundra Port. The highest court in India issued a rebuke to Gujarat High Court for "adopting dual standards" when making its decision in favour of a business group.

Allegations of stock manipulation 
In January 2023, Hindenburg Research published the findings of a two-year investigation claiming that Adani had engaged in market manipulation and accounting malpractices. Hindenburg also disclosed that it was holding short positions on Adani Group companies. Bonds and shares of companies associated with Adani experienced a decline in value after the accusations. Adani denied the fraud allegations as 'unfounded and ill intentioned'.

See also
 List of ports in India
 Adani Group

References

External links

1998 establishments in Gujarat
Transport companies established in 1998
Infrastructure in India
Adani Group
NIFTY 50
Indian companies established in 1998
Companies listed on the National Stock Exchange of India
Companies listed on the Bombay Stock Exchange